Countess Praskovya Sergeevna Uvarova (Russian: Прасковья Сергеевна Уварова),  Princess Scherbatova (Щербатова); 9 April 1840, Bobriki, Kharkov Governorate – 30 June 1924, Dobrna, Slovenia) was a Russian archaeologist.

Life
Uvarova was the daughter of Sergey Alexandrovich (1800-1864) and Princess Praskovya Borisovna (née Svyatopolk-Chetvertinskaya) (1818-1899). In the course of her education, she mastered French, German and English.

Soon after the wedding, the couple traveled to Rome, Naples and Florence where Uvarova introduced her husband to the splendors of Europe.

When her husband died in 1885, she succeeded him as chairman of the Archaeological Society and presided over ten archaeological congresses for all of Russia. In 1895, Uvarova was elected an honorary member of the St. Petersburg Academy of Sciences, becoming the first Russian woman to do so. (A Russian-born Swede Sofya Kovalevskaya was already a corresponding member of the academy.)

Uvarova conducted large expeditions with a focus on the Caucasus, according to Khrushkova,She explored the areas of the Caucasus foothills away from the coast. In her own words, she had “very often to get to the sites via completely overgrown, little known and inaccessible trails,” “riding around those upland spaces or deaf gorges which lie beyond roads and communications, and which, with rare exceptions, can only be reached on horseback” (Уварова 1894, 2). In the area of the Tsebelda valley, Uvarova found a group of small medieval churches, often decorated with sculptures. Some of the monuments that she published remain poorly understood.As a result of her work, several volumes of Ancient Caucasus were published on her initiative, several of them with her own contributions, among them (Materialy po archeologii Kavkaza). In 1916, she was celebrated by 30 of the most distinguished archaeologists of contemporary Russia.

As a result of the Russian Revolution of 1917, the title of "Countess" had become a stigma and her collections and property were confiscated. On 30 June 1924, she emigrated to Yugoslavia, where she lived modestly.

Uvarova died at 84 on 30 June 1924 in Dobrna, Slovenia. She is buried in Novo Groblje (New Cemetery) in Belgrade.

Family 
Uvarova and her husband had seven children.

 Alexei (Алексей) (1859-1913)
 Praskovja (Прасковья) (1860–1934)
 Sergei (Сергей) (1862–1888)
 Ekaterina (Екатерина) (died in infancy, 1863)
 Ekaterina (1864–1953)
 Fyodor (Фёдор) (1866–1954)
 Igor (Игорь) (1869–1934)

Memberships
 Honorary Member of the St Petersburg Academy of Sciences
 Honorary Member of the Russian Academy of Sciences

References
 Уварова П. С. Былое. Давно прошедшие счастливые дни / Государственный Исторический музей. — М.: ГИМ, 2005. — 368 с. — (Труды Государственного Исторического музея). — 1 000 экз. — . (в пер.)

External links
 

1840 births
1924 deaths
People from Kharkov Governorate
Archaeologists from the Russian Empire
Honorary members of the Saint Petersburg Academy of Sciences
Honorary Members of the Russian Academy of Sciences (1917–1925)
19th-century scientists from the Russian Empire
Woman scientists from the Russian Empire
Russian women archaeologists